Nyoma parallela is a species of beetle in the family Cerambycidae. It was described by Duvivier in 1892. It is known from the Democratic Republic of the Congo.

References

Desmiphorini
Beetles described in 1892
Endemic fauna of the Democratic Republic of the Congo